Lee Miller Emile Morin (born September 9, 1952) is a United States Navy Captain and NASA astronaut. He flew on STS-110 in 2002.

Personal data
Born in Manchester, New Hampshire, Morin is married with two children and three grandchildren. An amateur machinist, he enjoys math and jogging.

Education
1970: Graduated from the Western Reserve Academy, Hudson, Ohio
1974: Received a Bachelor of Science degree in Mathematical/Electrical science from the University of New Hampshire
1978: Received a Master of Science degree in Biochemistry from New York University
1981: Received a Doctorate of Medicine degree from New York University School of Medicine
1982: Received a Doctorate of Microbiology degree from New York University
1988: Received a Master of Public Health degree from the University of Alabama at Birmingham
2008: Received a Master in Science degree in Physics from the University of Houston Clear Lake

Organizations
Aerospace Medical Association
Force Recon Association
Undersea and Hyperbaric Medical Society
Society of United States Naval Flight Surgeons.

Awards
Meritorious Service Medal
Navy Commendation Medal
Navy Achievement Medal
Navy Unit Commendation
Meritorious Unit Commendation (two awards)
Overseas Service Ribbon
National Defense Service Medal
Kuwait Liberation Medal (Kuwait)
Southwest Asia Service Medal
Expert Pistol Medal
Expert Rifle Medal

Badges
Captain Morin has been awarded the following US Navy Badges:
US Navy Astronaut Wings aboard STS-110
US Navy Flight Medical Office's Wings while at Naval Aerospace Medical Institute in Pensacola, Florida
US Navy Diving Officer's Badge and US Navy Submarine Medical Officer's Badge while serving aboard the USS Henry M. Jackson (SSBN-730)

Special honors
Recipient of the 1994 Chairman of the Joint Chiefs of Staff Award for Excellence in Military Medicine (also known as the Fisher Award)
Finalist of the 1995 Innovations in American Government Award from the John F. Kennedy School of Government at Harvard University and the Ford Foundation
Received the 1996 Sustaining Membership Lecture Award for the Association of Military Surgeons of the United States.

Experience
After graduating from the University of New Hampshire in 1974, Morin worked at the Massachusetts Institute of Technology in the laboratory now known as the Media Lab. Morin matriculated at New York University School of Medicine in 1974, received a Master of Science in Biochemistry in 1978, an M.D. in 1981, and a Ph.D. in Microbiology in 1982. He then completed two years of residency training in General Surgery at the Bronx Municipal Hospital Center and at Montefiore Medical Center in The Bronx, New York City.

In 1982, Morin received a Direct Commission in the U.S. Naval Reserve. In 1983, he entered active duty and attended the Naval Undersea Medical Institute in Groton, Connecticut. He was designated as an Undersea Medical Officer in 1983. He joined the crew of the submarine  at the Electric Boat Company Shipyards in Groton. He remained aboard as Medical Officer for both Blue and Gold crews until 1985 when the ship arrived at its home port in Bangor, Washington. During his tour aboard Henry M. Jackson, Morin qualified as a Diving Medical Officer, and also received his "Dolphins" as a qualified Submarine Medical Officer.

Morin then entered Flight Surgeon training at the Naval Aerospace Medical Institute (NAMI) in Pensacola, Florida. He received his "Wings of Gold" as a Naval Flight Surgeon in 1986, and remained on the staff at NAMI as Flight Surgeon/Diving Medal Officer until 1989. While at NAMI, he received his Masters of Public Health degree from the University of Alabama at Birmingham. He then left active duty and entered private practice in occupational medicine in Jacksonville, Florida. He remained in the Naval Reserve, and drilled with the United States Marine Corps' 3rd Force Reconnaissance Company in Mobile, Alabama.

In August 1990, he was recalled to active duty during Operation Desert Shield, when he was assigned to Branch Clinic, Naval Air Station Pensacola as a Flight Surgeon. Morin volunteered to reenter active duty, and was assigned to Administrative Support Unit, Bahrain, as Diving Medical Officer/Flight Surgeon during Operation Desert Storm and during the post-war build-down period.

In 1992, Morin rejoined the staff at NAMI, initially as Special Projects Officer. He was named the Director of Warfare Specialty Programs when NAMI became Naval Aerospace and Operational Medical Institute (NAOMI). In 1995, Morin entered the Residency in Aerospace Medicine at the Naval Aerospace and Operational Medical Institute. He completed the residency in 1996.

NASA
Selected as an astronaut candidate by NASA in April 1996, Morin reported to the Johnson Space Center in August 1996. Having completed two years of training and evaluation, he is qualified for flight assignment as a mission specialist. Initially assigned technical duties in the Astronaut Office Computer Support Branch, followed by the Astronaut Office Advanced Vehicles Branch. He served a one-year tour with the U.S. State Department, where he was Deputy Assistant Secretary for Health, Space, and Science. He is currently assigned to the Exploration Branch of the Astronaut Office. He is leading the rapid prototyping of the cockpit for the new Orion spacecraft, and is deputy lead of the Orion Cockpit Working Group.  Morin served on the EVA crew of STS-110 (2002) and has logged over 259 hours in space, including over 14 EVA hours. 

As of December 2016, Morin was assigned to the Exploration Branch, where he works on the Orion Multipurpose Crew Vehicle.

As of 2021, Morin is a management astronaut which mean he is no longer eligible for flight assignment.

Space flight experience
STS-110 Atlantis (April 8–19, 2002) was the 13th Space Shuttle mission to visit the International Space Station. Mission milestones included: the delivery and installation of the SO (S-Zero) Truss; the first time the station's robotic arm was used to maneuver spacewalkers around the station; and the first time that all of a shuttle crew's spacewalks were based from the station's Quest Airlock. Morin performed 2 EVAs totaling 14 hours and 9 minutes. The crew prepared the station for future spacewalks and spent a week in joint operations with the station's Expedition 4 crew. Mission duration was 10 days, 19 hours and 42 minutes.

References 

1952 births
Living people
Physician astronauts
United States Navy astronauts
People from Manchester, New Hampshire
Military personnel from New Hampshire
American people of French-Canadian descent
University of New Hampshire alumni
New York University Grossman School of Medicine alumni
University of Alabama at Birmingham alumni
United States Navy Medical Corps officers
United States Navy captains
Submariners
Western Reserve Academy alumni
Space Shuttle program astronauts
Spacewalkers